Pak Yong-ok is a former women's international table tennis player from North Korea.

Table tennis career
From 1976 to 1980 she won several medals in doubles, and team events in the Asian Table Tennis Championships and in the World Table Tennis Championships.

Her three World Championship medals included a gold medal in the doubles at the 1977 World Table Tennis Championships.

See also
 List of table tennis players
 List of World Table Tennis Championships medalists

References

North Korean female table tennis players